Hastina pluristrigata is a moth in the family Geometridae first described by Frederic Moore in 1868. It is found in China and India.

References

Moths described in 1868
Asthenini